This list of museums in Kentucky is a list of museums, defined for this context as institutions (including nonprofit organizations, government entities, and private businesses) that collect and care for objects of cultural, artistic, scientific, or historical interest and make their collections or related exhibits available for public viewing. Museums that exist only in cyberspace (i.e., virtual museums) are not included.

Museums

Defunct museums
 Charles Jackson Circus Museum, Hopkinsville, collections now at the Pennyroyal Area Museum
 Alben W. Barkley Museum, Paducah
 Barren River Imaginative Museum of Science, Bowling Green, closed in 2012
 Floyd Collins Museum, Cave City, closed in 2013
 Morris Toy Museum, Carrsville
 Schmidt Museum of Coca-Cola Memorabilia, Elizabethtown, closed in 2012

See also
 Aquaria in Kentucky (category)
 Nature Centers in Kentucky

References

External links
Kentucky Tourism
Tour SE Kentucky

Kentucky
Museums
Museums